Internationale Schillertage ("International Schiller Days", commonly abbreviated as Schillertage) is a theatre festival taking place every two years in the Mannheim National Theatre in Mannheim, Baden-Württemberg in Germany about the works of Friedrich Schiller. The first Internationale Schillertage took place in 1978. In 2015, about 21,000 visitors came to the Internationale Schillertage.

External links 
Official website

Theatre festivals in Germany